Ahruiyeh (also Romanized as Ahrū’īyeh) is a village in Qaleh Asgar Rural District, Lalehzar District, Bardsir County, Kerman Province, Iran. At the 2006 census, its population was 49, in 12 families.

References 

Populated places in Bardsir County